"The V Word" is the third episode of the second season of Masters of Horror. It originally aired in North America on November 10, 2006.

Plot
Two teenage boys, Kerry (Arjay Smith) and Justin (Branden Nadon), are bored at Justin's house. The two are best friends and spend a lot of time together since Justin's mother, Carolyn and little sister Lisa (Silent Hill's Jodelle Ferland) are away for the weekend. Justin tells Kerry that he resents his father since his recent divorce from his mother and how he is never there when he needs him. Later, the two decide to break into an old mortuary for thrills.

When they arrive at the mysterious funeral home, Justin's cousin James, who works there, does not respond to their knocks on the front door. After noticing that the door is unlocked, the two teenage boys look around, but find the place deserted. Soon, they find James and the entire funeral staff dead. Suddenly, a strange man (Michael Ironside), a vampire, attacks them, tearing into and biting Kerry's neck while Justin is forced to flee.

Justin returns home and tries to phone his mother, but cannot get through. He tries calling his father, but his father brushes him off. Justin is about to call the police, but he thinks twice when he imagines they'll hang up on him, for Justin apparently has a history of making prank phone calls. After pleading with Justin to be let in, Kerry stumbles into the house with a ghastly neck wound, claiming to have gotten away from the vampire. When Justin tries to call for an ambulance, Kerry drinks every milk carton and water bottle in the refrigerator, claiming to be "thirsty" before suddenly attacking and biting Justin.

Justin wakes up the next morning, feeling dizzy and finds that he is unable to stand bright lights. Carolyn and Lisa return home, and when Kerry's mother calls, asking of her son's whereabouts since he apparently did not come home last night, Carolyn asks Justin where Kerry is. Justin denies knowing Kerry's whereabouts. As night falls again, Justin becomes aware that he has transformed into a vampire, but tries to restrain himself and confines himself to his bedroom. After a while, he goes over to his father's house, where he meets Kerry who tries to persuade Justin to kill his father for the years of neglect. However, Justin refuses. Frustrated, Kerry kills Justin's father himself by cutting his throat with a shard from a broken mirror.

Kerry and Justin then meet the vampire who attacked them the previous night. Justin identifies him as Mr. Chaney, a former teacher of theirs. Chaney tells them that he recently became a vampire and wants to spread his newfound powers to his former students. They go back to the mortuary, where Justin discovers that Chaney had kidnapped Lisa and has her tied up. He wants Justin to kill her and embrace his new life as a vampire, but Justin instead attacks Chaney. He and Kerry kill Chaney, and Justin frees Lisa. Justin realizes that he and Kerry are now doomed to walk the earth as bloodthirsty killers and makes the devastating choice to kill himself rather than feed on the blood of the innocent, while Kerry wants to experiment with his new life. After bidding each other goodbye, Kerry leaves while Justin remains behind. As dawn breaks, Lisa returns home to her mother, while Justin allows the sunlight to hit him and burn him to death.

The following night, Kerry is on a bus to New York City, where he talks to a fellow passenger. The passenger tells Kerry he is hungry, to which Kerry responds that he is also getting hungry.

See also 
List of vampire television series

External links

Podcasters Of Horror on The Super Network

2006 American television episodes
Masters of Horror episodes
Television episodes about vampires
Television episodes directed by Ernest Dickerson